Emanuel Xavier (born May 3, 1970), is an American poet, spoken word artist, author, editor, and LGBTQ activist born and raised in the Bushwick area of Brooklyn. Associated with the East Village, Manhattan arts scene in New York City, he emerged from the ball culture scene and the Nuyorican movement to become a successful poet, writer and advocate for gay youth programs and Latino gay literature.

Early years
Born Emanuel Xavier Granja in Brooklyn, New York to an Ecuadorian mother, Xavier's father abandoned them after finding out she was pregnant. He was raised by his mother and her live in boyfriend, who was separated from his wife but remained married throughout the years. He was never told anything about his real father. As a child, Xavier was the victim of child sexual abuse by a relative.  He grew up in Bushwick in the 1970s, at a time when it was mostly an immigrant community made up of Puerto Ricans, blacks and some Italians. He was bused during a time to a mostly white elementary school in Queens where he experienced racism. At age 16, he came out to his mother and her live in boyfriend and was kicked out for being gay. He survived the streets as an underage male prostitute at the Christopher Street West Side Highway piers and became involved with the House of Xtravaganza and the 1980s ball scene. It was during this time that he befriended many notable members of the trans world and ball community, many of whom were feautred in the documentary Paris Is Burning. After returning home under strict new rules, he graduated Grover Cleveland High School (Queens) and then attended St. John's University for several years, dropping out after receiving his associate's degree in communications. He moved to the West Village and became a drug dealer at New York City gay nightclubs. Xavier later worked at A Different Light (bookstore). He has said that he viewed poetry as an "outlet to unleash pain and anger."

Professional career
He self-published the poetry chapbook,Pier Queen in 1997.

With the help of Willi Ninja in 1998, he created the House of Xavier and the Glam Slam, an annual downtown arts event staged at the Nuyorican Poets Cafe (and later at the Bowery Poetry Club). The House of Xavier and House of Xtravaganza collaborated to stage other more traditional ball events.

Painted Leaf Press, a now defunct independent publishing company, published Xavier's semi-autobiographical novel Christ Like in 1999. Despite a limited press run, the novel was nominated for a Lambda Literary Award in the Small Press category. It was later reprinted in 2009 by Rebel Satori Press as a revised ten-year-anniversary edition.

In 2000, Xavier hosted the Lambda Literary Awards ceremony in New York.

In 2001, after 9/11, Xavier helped create Words to Comfort, a poetry benefit held at the New School. His poem "September Song" was included as part of the initial National September 11 Memorial & Museum website and later appeared in his 2002 poetry collection Americano. 

In the early 2000s, he was quoted as saying “The gay agenda is not necessarily part of the hip-hop movement. The only Simmons that may ever feature me is Richard, not Russell.”  
This led to his invitation to feature twice on Russell Simmons Presents Def Poetry. He also hosted In The Life with Laverne Cox. He appeared in the Wolfgang Busch documentary How Do I Look and co-starred in the feature film The Ski Trip.

Xavier edited the anthology Bullets & Butterflies: Queer Spoken Word Poetry in 2005, earning him a second Lambda Literary Award nomination in the Anthologies category. A few years later, in 2008, he edited the anthology Mariposas: A Modern Anthology of Queer Latino Poetry.

El Museo del Barrio staged a choreographed dance presentation based on his spoken word album Legendary in 2010.

If Jesus Were Gay was the third full length poetry collection by Emanuel Xavier first published in 2010. The publication of this book was controversial because of a traditional Jesus on the cover and graphic gay sex inside.

He published his poetry collection Nefarious in 2013.

Xavier was selected as a featured speaker for TEDx Bushwick on March 21, 2015.
He also filmed for a documentary from Spain which included poets from around the world (Iceland, Jordan, Palestine). An excerpt of the documentary was released as the short film Americano. He also helped organize the first After Sunset: Poetry Walk at The High Line with The Academy of American Poets. A year later, he published Radiance.

For the 50th anniversary of the Stonewall Inn riots, Xavier was part of the Stonewall Inn Gives Back Initiative in 2019. Other participants included Amanda Lepore, Dionne Warwick, Kate Bornstein, Lea DeLaria, Michael Musto, Michael Urie and Nico Tortorella.

He works for Penguin Random House and founded The Penguin Random House LGBTQ Network in 2011, where he originally served as chair of the group.

Selected Poems of Emanuel Xavier, a curated career-spanning collection of his poetry was published in 2021.

In 2022, it was announced that he joined the Board of The Publishing Triangle.

Activism
PEN America invited him to read his poem "Americano" at the  Writer's Resist rally on the steps of The New York Public Library in protest of the Trump administration in 2017. The same year, a week long exhibit was staged to celebrate the 20th anniversary of his poetry collection Pier Queen. 

In 2018, he was invited to share his poetry at The United Nations as part of The International Symposium on Cultural Diplomacy. He shared a new poem about gun control, and after criticism, he was uninvited back as a speaker.

Assault and aftermath
In October 2005, Xavier was attacked by a group of about 20 young men in the Bushwick area of Brooklyn. Despite various rumors about the attack—some suggested it stemmed from his granting the Latin Kings gang permission to publish one of his poems, "Waiting for God", which dealt with police brutality.

After the attack, Xavier was diagnosed with an acoustic neuroma, a type of brain tumor, and had surgery; the tumor was benign, but resulted in a period of partial facial paralysis. He recovered from the paralysis; however, he became deaf in his right ear In 2015, he announced on his personal website that the acoustic neuroma had returned. By year's end, he underwent successful radiosurgery.

Awards and honors
In 2010, The Equality Forum named him an LGBTQ History Month Icon.

The American Library Association selected Xavier's poetry collections If Jesus Were Gay and Nefarious for its Over The Rainbow Books lists for 2011  and  2015 respectively.

He is the recipient of a Gay City Impact Award and the Marsha A. Gomez Cultural Heritage Award.

He has served as a judge for the Lambda Literary Awards and as poetry judge for The Saints & Sinners LGBTQ+ Literary Festival.

Bibliography
Poetry

Americano, Rebel Satori Press, 2022 (twentieth anniversary reissue of the original 2002 edition)
Selected Poems of Emanuel Xavier, Rebel Satori Press, 2021 (Finalist- International Latino Book Award- Best Poetry Book Award One Author- English)
If Jesus Were Gay, Rebel Satori Press, 2020 (tenth anniversary reissue of the original 2010 edition)
Radiance, Rebel Satori Press, 2016
Nefarious, Rebel Satori Press, 2013 (Finalist- International Latino Book Award- Best Poetry Book – One Author – Bilingual)
Pier Queen, Rebel Satori Press, 2012 (official publication of a self-published chapbook from 1997)

Fiction

Christ Like, Rebel Satori Press, 2009 (Lambda Literary Award finalist)

Edited collections
Mariposas: A Modern Anthology of Queer Latino Poetry, Floricanto Press, 2008, edited by Emanuel Xavier
Bullets & Butterflies: queer spoken word poetry, suspect thoughts press, 2005, edited by Emanuel Xavier (Lambda Literary Award finalist)
Me No Habla With Acento, El Museo del Barrio & Rebel Satori Press, 2011, edited by Emanuel Xavier (Finalist- International Latino Book Award- Best Poetry Book – English)

Anthologies featuring work
Queer & Catholic, edited by Trebor Healey & Amie M. Evans, Haworth Press, 2008 (features the poems "Just Like Jesus" and "Bastard" from If Jesus Were Gay & other poems)
Ambientes: New Queer Latino Writing, edited by Lázaro Lima and Felice Picano, University of Wisconsin Press, 2011 (features "Dear Rodney" from If Jesus Were Gay & other poems)
collective BRIGHTNESS: LGBTIQ Poets on Faith, Religion & Spirituality, edited by Kevin Simmonds, Sibling Rivalry Press, 2011 (features the poem "The Omega Has Been Postponed" from If Jesus Were Gay & other poems)
Born This Way: Real Stories of Growing Up Gay, edited by Paul Vitagliano, Quirk Books, 2012 (features an essay)
For Colored Boys Who Have Considered Suicide When the Rainbow is Still Not Enough, edited by Keith Boykin, Magnus Books, 2012 (features the essay "Mariconcito")
Studs, edited by Richard Labonte, Cleis Press, 2014 (selected finalists and wrote introduction)
Untangling the Knot: Queer Voices on Marriage, Relationships & Identity, edited by Carter Sickels, Ooligan Press, 2015 (essay)
If You Can Hear This: Poems in Protest of an American Inauguration, edited by Bryan Borland, Sibling Rivalry Press, 2017 (features a reprint of the poem "Americano")
Nepantla: An Anthology Dedicated to Queer Poets of Color, edited by Christopher Soto, Nightboat Press, 2018 (features a reprint of the poem "Step Father")

Misc.
A Tale of Two Cities: Disco Era Bushwick, Bizarre Publishing, 2014, Meryl Meisler (features the poems "El Hair Espray" and "Legendary")
Purgatory & Paradise: Sassy '70s- Suburbia & The City, Bizarre Publishing, 2015, Meryl Meisler (features the poem "Paradise")
Paradise Lost: Bushwick Era Disco, Bizarre Publishing, 2021, Meryl Meisler (features the poems "Bushwick Bohemia" and "Legendary")

Discography
Legendary The Spoken Word Poetry of Emanuel Xavier, ELKAT Productions, 2010
Legendary (The RE-Mixes), Hades Music, 2010
Sound X, Royal Advisor Records, 2011
Pulse, Nymphs & Thugs Recording Co., 2021

References

External links
Home

American people of Ecuadorian descent
Poets from New York (state)
American gay writers
1971 births
Living people
American LGBT poets
LGBT people from New York (state)
American male poets
21st-century American poets
People from Bushwick, Brooklyn
LGBT Hispanic and Latino American people
21st-century American male writers
Gay poets